Northeast of Seoul is a 1972 American action-thriller film directed by David Lowell Rich. It stars Anita Ekberg and John Ireland, with music by Alan Heyman.

Plot

Cast
 Anita Ekberg as Katherine
 John Ireland as Flanaghan
 Victor Buono as Portman
 Yung-Kyoon Sin as Captain Lee
 Chi-He Choi as Miss Kim
 Oh-Sang Kwon as Smim
 Invan Stansby as South African
 Jae-Daf Go as Manchurian
 Young-Sun Kak as Moh
 Sam Chae as Chae Sakamon
 Yong-Nam Jioe as Kang

References

External links

1972 films
1970s action thriller films
American action thriller films
Films directed by David Lowell Rich
Films set in South Korea
Treasure hunt films
Golan-Globus films
Films shot in South Korea
1970s English-language films
1970s American films